Private Thomas W. Stivers (July 15, 1850 — June 28, 1877), also known under the name Thomas "Tom" Stevens or Stevers, was an American soldier in the U.S. Army who served with the 7th U.S. Cavalry during the Great Sioux War of 1876-77. One of twenty-four men to be awarded the Medal of Honor for gallantry at the Battle of the Little Bighorn on June 25, 1876, Stivers was among the soldiers who volunteered to carry water from the Little Bighorn River to the wounded on Reno Hill and awarded the Medal of Honor in 1878. He and two other fellow Kentuckians, Privates William M. Harris and George D. Scott, received the MOH for their role in the battle though Stivers received his posthumously.

Biography
Thomas W. Stivers was born in Madison County, Kentucky, on July 15, 1850, the son of 
John W "Buck" Stivers (1822–1912) and his wife Mary Frances Ballard (1829–1884). Tom later moved to Mt. Vernon where he worked as a clerk. In August 1871, at the age of 21, he enlisted in the United States Army and was assigned to Company D of the 7th U.S. Cavalry Regiment for frontier duty. At the start of the Great Sioux War of 1876–77, Stivers accompanied the 7th U.S. Cavalry to the Dakota Territory and was present at the Battle of the Little Bighorn. He was one of nineteen men who volunteered to fetch water from the Little Big Horn and carry it to the wounded on Reno Hill throughout the battle. While four troopers exposed themselves to heavy enemy fire, in order to give covering fire, Stivers and fourteen others managed to leave the right wing of Captain Frederick Benteen's line and crossed eighty yards of "fire-swept ground" to reach a deep ravine which they used for cover to get to the river. They then used heavy camp kettles to make repeated trips back and forth from the Little Big Horn to Reno Hill.

Stivers and the other Little Big Horn water carriers faced great danger, especially with Sioux braves hidden in bushes along the river, and at least one of the soldiers was wounded in an ambush. He and the rest of the water carriers were cited for gallantry, along with five others for direct combat actions, and awarded the Medal of Honor two years after the battle though Stivers received his posthumously. Stivers was discharged on August 5, 1876, while encamped with his unit at the mouth of Rosebud Creek in the Montana Territory, and returned to Kentucky where he attempted to go into business for himself. He died less than a year later, murdered over a business dispute, in Kingston on June 28, 1877, at age 27. Stivers was buried in the city cemetery of nearby Richmond, Kentucky.

Stivers was one of three Kentuckians, along with Privates William M. Harris and George D. Scott, who were awarded the Medal of Honor for their actions during the battle, and as such, they have received special honors by their home state. Their role at the Little Big Horn is mentioned on a marker at the Richmond Cemetery where Stivers and Harris (both Marion County natives) are buried, though the location of Scott's gravesite is unknown. Kentucky Highway 1295, a state highway which runs through Kirksville to Garrard County, was later designated as the Harris-Scott-Stivers Memorial Highway. On June 26, 1999, a special commemoration ceremony to honor Kentucky's Medal of Honor winners was held for Stivers, Harris and Scott, at the Blue Grass Army Depot in Richmond; they were also listed at the Kentucky Medal of Honor Memorial in Louisville. Ten years later, the Richmond Register began profiling Stivers and other local MOH winners. On June 25, 2010, the Richmond Register published a second story honoring the men on the 134th anniversary of the battle.

Medal of Honor citation
Rank and organization: Private, Company D, 7th U.S. Cavalry. Place and date: At Little Big Horn, Mont., 25–26 June 1876. Entered service at: Mt. Vernon, Ky. Birth: Madison County, Ky. Date of issue: 5 October 1878.

Citation
Voluntarily brought water to the wounded under fire.

See also

List of Medal of Honor recipients for the Indian Wars

References

Further reading
Hardorff, Richard G. The Custer Battle Casualties: Burials, Exhumations, and Reinterments. El Segundo, California: Upton & Sons, 1989. 
Konstantin, Phil. This Day in North American Indian History: Important Dates in the History of North America's Native Peoples for Every Calendar Day. New York: Da Capo Press, 2002. 
Magnussen, Daniel O., ed. Peter Thompson's Narrative of the Little Bighorn Campaign, 1876: A Critical Analysis of an Eyewitness Account of the Custer Debacle. Glendale, California: Arthur H. Clark Company, 1974. 
Overfield, Loyd J. The Little Big Horn, 1876: The Official Communications, Documents, and Reports, with Rosters of the Officers and Troops of the Campaign. Glendale, California: Arthur H. Clarke Company, 1971. 
Willert, James. Little Big Horn Diary: A Chronicle of the 1876 Indian War. El Segundo, California: Upton & Sons, 1997.

External links
 Retrieved on December 29, 2010
Indian War Campaigns Medal of Honor Recipients for the United States Army at Army Knowledge Online

1850 births
1877 deaths
American military personnel of the Indian Wars
United States Army Medal of Honor recipients
People from Madison County, Kentucky
United States Army soldiers
People murdered in Kentucky
American Indian Wars recipients of the Medal of Honor
People from Rockcastle County, Kentucky